MTV Supermodel of the Year is an Indian reality television series, which premiered on 22 December 2019 and broadcast on MTV India. The viewers will see several women compete for the title of Supermodel of the Year, providing them with an opportunity to begin their career in the modelling industry.

Judges and mentors

Season Summary

Season 1

Contestants
(Ages stated are at start of contest)

Episodes

Audition Task Summary

Super Score Board 

 The contestant won.
 The contestant was the runner-up.
 The contestant was the 2nd runner-up.
 The contestant returned as a guest for that episode.

 Highest score of the week.
 Lowest score of the week.
 Survived the Survival Battle.
 Lowest score and eliminated.

Episodes Super Scoring Chart

Boot-Camp Phase

Episode 4

Episode 6

Episode 7

Episode 9

Battle Phase

Episode 10

Episode 11

Episode 12

Episode 13

Episode 14 - GRAND FINALE

Season 2 
In March 2021, the auditions for Season 2 were open on Voot. On 3 August 2021, it was announced season 2 will premiere on 22 August 2021.

Season 2 premiered on 22 August 2021 on MTV India and streamed 24 hours before on Voot Select.

Contestants

Episodes

Super Score Board 

 The contestant won.
 The contestant was the runner-up.
 The contestant was the 2nd runner-up.

 Highest score of the week.
 Lowest score of the week.
 Lowest score and eliminated.

Episodes Super Scoring Chart

Episode 3

Episode 4

Episode 6

Episode 7

Episode 8

Episode 9

Creative Director Of The Year 
The Top 4 models got the opportunity to score Anusha and Milind based on their advise given during photoshoots and runways.

Top 4 Score Table

Episode 10 - GRAND FINALE

See also 
India's Next Top Model
Top Model India
Get Gorgeous

References

External links
Supermodel of the Year on IMDb

Indian reality television series
Modeling-themed reality television series